Rustem Enver oğlu Umerov (born 19 April 1982) is a Ukrainian politician, businessman, investor, and philanthropist of Crimean Tatar origin. Umerov was a member of the 9th Ukrainian Verkhovna Rada (Ukrainian parliament) from 2019 to 2022, resigning to become head of the State Property Fund of Ukraine. Before his election he was the CEO of ASTEM Company, which specializes in communications, IT and infrastructure investment.

He is deputy head of the permanent delegation to the Parliamentary Assembly of the Council of Europe, a delegate of the Qurultay of the Crimean Tatar People, and an adviser to former Mejlis of the Crimean Tatar People chair Mustafa Dzhemilev. Since December 2020, Umerov has co-chaired the Crimea Platform diplomatic initiative.

Personal life 
Umerov was born in 1982 in Samarkand, in the Uzbek Soviet Socialist Republic, to a Crimean Tatar Muslim family from Alushta, in Ukraine's southern Crimean peninsula. His father, Enver Umerov, was an engineering technologist; his mother, Meryem Umerova, was a chemical engineer.

On 18 May 1944, Umerov's family was deported by the Soviet government with the Crimean Tatar people from their homeland of Crimea to the Uzbek SSR. In 2015, the Verkhovna Rada recognized this deportation as a genocide of the Crimean Tatar people. After 50 years of exile and the beginning of Crimean Tatar repatriation during the late 1980s and early 1990s, the Umerov family returned to their homeland.

Education 
Umerov received a bachelor's degree in economics and a master's degree in finance from the National Academy of Management.

Career 
ASTEM manages investments in the fields of communications, information technology, and infrastructure. The foundation funded Stanford University's Ukrainian Emerging Leaders program.

Since 2019, Umerov has been a People's Deputy of Ukraine from the Holos political party. In September 2022, the Verkhovna Rada appointed him as head of the Ukrainian State Property Fund.

Political activity 
In the July 2019 Ukrainian parliamentary election, Umerov was elected a People's Deputy of Ukraine from the Holos party. He has co-authored almost 100 bills, drafted a statement by the Verkhovna Rada on the illegitimacy of Russia's vote on amendments to the annexation of Crimea by the Russian Federation, and introduced a bill on the abolition of the Crimean free economic zone.

Umerov helped spearhead the construction of 1,000 apartments for internally-displaced Crimean Tatars and other Ukrainian citizens with Turkish support. In early April 2021, Ukrainian president Volodymyr Zelenskyy and Turkish president Recep Tayyip Erdoğan agreed to begin building the apartments. Ukrainian Minister of Reintegration of Temporarily Occupied Territories Oleksii Reznikov and Turkish Minister of Environment, Urbanisation and Climate Change Murat Kurum signed an agreement in which Turkey would build 500 apartments: 200 in Mykolaiv, 200 in Kherson, and 100 in Kyiv. Umerov has said on Facebook that Ukraine will not supply water to Crimea while Russian occupation continues. Because Russia has violated international law, it is responsible for the humanitarian needs of the people of Crimea.

In May 2020, he co-authored a bill on the payment of hospital bills to physicians because of COVID-19, regardless of length of service and at 100 percent of the average salary. In September of that year, Umerov and other deputies initiated a resolution to the government on the redistribution of money from the Fund to Fight COVID-19 to ensure a safe education during the quarantine. He co-authored a bill establishing a procedure for recognizing stateless persons. The law, allowing such persons to legally remain in Ukraine and obtain a document certifying their identity and status, became effective on 18 July 2020. Umerov collaborated on a bill exempting internally-displaced persons from tourist tax for living in temporary accommodations which was signed into law on 12 October 2020.

International activity 
Umerov is deputy head of the permanent delegation to the Parliamentary Assembly of the Council of Europe (PACE), and co-chairs the groups for inter-parliamentary relations with Saudi Arabia and Turkey. In May 2020, he appealed to the UN, the European Parliament, the Parliamentary Assembly of the Council of Europe, the OSCE, NATO, and the Organization of the Black Sea Economic Cooperation to honor victims of the Crimean Tatar genocide and condemn Russia's violations of their rights and freedoms. In January 2021, as part of a delegation to the PACE winter session, Umerov raised the issue of violation of the rights of Ukrainians and Crimean Tatars in Crimea by the Russian occupiers. Ukrainians and Crimean Tatars, due to their ethnic affiliation and Ukrainian position, are subject to inspection by the occupation administration; this results in repression and illegal imprisonment. Ethnic profiling results in the failure to provide medical care to Russian political hostages. Umerov raised the issue of compulsory vaccination by Russia of Ukrainian citizens in Crimea with its Sputnik V COVID-19 vaccine, which did not pass third-stage clinical trials. He meets with international partners to inform them about systemic human-rights violations, including those against Crimean Tatars in temporarily-occupied Crimea.

Crimea 
Umerov facilitated the 2017 release of two Kremlin political prisoners, Crimean Tatars Ahtem Chiygoz and İlmi Ümerov. In 2020, he established an interdepartmental coordination center focused on the release of Ukrainian political prisoners. In March 2020, Umerov initiated parliamentary hearings on the de-occupation and reintegration of Crimea and Sevastopol in March of that year to develop a single, strategic document on the return of the region to Ukraine. The document is expected to be part of the Development Strategy of Ukraine-2030. Umerov regularly communicates with Ukrainian authorities on exchanges of Crimean political prisoners and prisoners of war. In July 2020, he drafted a statement by the Verkhovna Rada on the illegitimacy of an all-Russian vote on amendments to the Constitution of the Russian Federation concerning Crimean territory. The statement was supported by 306 deputies. In September of that year, Umerov joined a group developing a state strategy for the de-occupation of Crimea and Sevastopol established by the National Security and Defense Council of Ukraine. He was supported by the parliamentary Human Rights Committee. 

Its purposes are to implement a parliamentary track within the framework of a unified state strategy of de-occupation and reintegration of Crimea, and to create an inter-parliamentary assembly to advocate the restoration of control of portions of the Black and Azov Seas. President Volodymyr Zelenskyy will coordinate international efforts to protect the rights of Crimeans and de-occupy the peninsula. The United States, Canada, the United Kingdom, Turkey, Moldova, and Slovakia then agreed to participate in the initiative, which is drafting about 20 bills about the annexed peninsula's indigenous peoples, the status of the Crimean Tatar people, and amendments to the Constitution of Ukraine concerning Crimea. Proposed bills address the water supply, political prisoners, and the abolition of the Crimean free economic zone with Russia.

He drafted a parliamentary appeal to the UN, the European Parliament, PACE, the OSCE Parliamentary Assemblies, NATO, and the BSEC condemning the temporary occupation of Crimea and Sevastopol, violations of human rights and freedoms, and calling for the release of Ukrainian political prisoners. The appeal was supported by 314 deputies.

Social activity 
Umerov supports his Crimean Tatar compatriots in Ukraine and abroad. He has participated in student, public and charitable events, individually and as part of organizations, since 1999. He was a 2007 founder of the Crimean Tatars Fellowship, which focuses on the regional representation of Crimean Tatars in Ukraine and the strengthening of social, cultural, and educational dialogue within the community in Kyiv and other Ukrainian cities. Umerov co-founded the international organization Bizim Qırım that year, which aimed to preserve national interests and promote the restoration of political, socioeconomic, cultural, linguistic, and religious rights of the Crimean Tatar people.

He was a co-founder and president of the Crimean Development Fund from 2011 to 2013, which aimed to promote the social activity of Crimean residents in forming a responsible community and overcoming the 1944 deportation of the Crimean Tatars. Umerov became a co-founder and board member of the Crimean International Business Association in 2012. Among the association's goals were helping to implement a strategy to develop the Crimean economy, supporting small and medium-sized businesses, introducing promising technologies, developing international cooperation, and improving the region's investment climate. Umerov's family funded the restoration of the 17th-century Orta Cami Mosque in Bakhchysarai that year as part of a national project to regain Crimea's cultural and historical heritage. The reconstructed mosque, which had been inactive for about 95 years, reopened on 16 August 2013.

In 2013, Umerov co-founded the ASTEM Foundation. The foundation aims to improve public life by supporting initiatives in social innovation, regional communities, education, medicine, sports, culture, human rights, and religious freedom. It sponsored the Ukrainian Emerging Leaders program at Stanford University, which was designed to train Ukrainian politicians, lawyers, social entrepreneurs, businessmen, and community leaders in skills to help solve development problems in Ukraine. Umerov co-founded the Evkaf Foundation in 2014 to help develop Muslim communities, provide charity, and promote civic activism. 
The Ukrainian Navy tugboat Yañı Qapu, damaged by the Russian military during the November 2018 Kerch Strait incident, was repaired in May 2020 with ASTEM Foundation support.

Crimean National Welfare Fund 
Umerov is a co-founder and board member of the Crimean National Welfare Fund, an international charitable organization which funds national programs and supports needy Crimean Tatars. Among the fund's projects is construction of a Crimean Tatar cultural and educational complex in Kyiv with Turkish support. The complex will be a public, cultural, social, educational, and spiritual center of the Crimean Tatars and Ukrainian Muslims. A mosque and spiritual center, an ethnographic center with a national museum and conference hall, schools, restaurants, and a recreation area are planned.

Peace negotiations and alleged poisoning 
Umerov was present at the March 2022 Russia–Ukraine peace negotiations after the Russian invasion of Ukraine. According to the independent Meduza website, Umerov was accused by the Kremlin and Russian state-controlled media of spying for the US and deliberately prolonging negotiations to benefit Ukraine. It was reported on 28 March that Umerov, Russian billionaire Roman Abramovich, and another lawmaker developed symptoms consistent with poisoning after the event, including "red eyes, constant and painful tearing, and peeling skin on their hands and faces". The three negotiators flew to Istanbul to receive medical attention. Umerov later posted on Facebook that he was "fine", and asked people not to trust "unverified information".

References 

1982 births
Living people
Ninth convocation members of the Verkhovna Rada
Crimean Tatar politicians
Directors of the State Property Fund of Ukraine
Voice (Ukrainian political party) politicians